Zeta Hydri, Latinized from ζ Hydri, is a single, white-hued star in the southern constellation of Hydrus. It is faintly visible to the naked eye with an apparent magnitude of 4.83. This distance to this star can be estimated from its annual parallax shift of 11.47 mas, showing it to be about 284 light years away. It is moving further away from the Sun with a radial velocity of +3.6 km/s.

The spectrum of this star matches a stellar classification of A2 IV, suggesting it is a subgiant star that is in the process of evolving away from the main sequence as the supply of hydrogen at its core becomes exhausted. It has a high rate of spin, showing a projected rotational velocity of 116 km/s. This is giving the star a slight oblate shape with an equatorial bulge that is 5% larger than the polar radius. It has 2.4 times the mass of the Sun and nearly four times the Sun's radius. Zeta Hydri is radiating 80 times the Sun's luminosity into space from its photosphere at an effective temperature of 9,144 K.

References

A-type subgiants
Hydrus (constellation)
Hydri, Zeta
Durchmusterung objects
017566
012876
0837